Fatma Y. Øktem (born 18 December 1973 in Aarhus) is a Danish politician, who is a member of the Folketing for the Venstre political party. She was elected into parliament at the 2019 Danish general election and previously sat in parliament from 2011 to 2015.

Political career
Øktem was first elected into parliament at the 2011 election. She was no reelected in the 2011 election, but became a substitute for Venstre in the East Jutland constituency. From 22 October to 6 November 2015 she substituted for Michael Aastrup Jensen in the Folketing. In the 2019 election she was elected into parliament on her own mandate again.

References

External links 
 Biography on the website of the Danish Parliament (Folketinget)

1973 births
Living people
People from Aarhus
Venstre (Denmark) politicians
21st-century Danish women politicians
Women members of the Folketing
Members of the Folketing 2011–2015
Members of the Folketing 2019–2022